Buckden railway station was a railway station in Buckden, Cambridgeshire. The station and its line closed in year 1959. The signal box is now preserved and in use as Tunbridge Wells West signal box on the Spa Valley Railway.

References

External links
 Buckden station on navigable 1946 O. S. map

Disused railway stations in Cambridgeshire
Former Midland Railway stations
Railway stations in Great Britain opened in 1866
Railway stations in Great Britain closed in 1959
1866 establishments in England